Smalls may refer to:

 Smalls (surname)
 Camp Robert Smalls, a United States Naval training facility
 Fort Robert Smalls, a Civil War redoubt
 Smalls Creek, a northern tributary of the Parramatta River
 Smalls Falls, a waterfall in Maine, USA
 Smalls Jazz Club, a jazz club located in New York City
 Nickname for responsions, an examination formerly conducted at Oxford University
 The Smalls, a group rocks off the coast of and the location of the Smalls Lighthouse
 The Smalls (1990–2001), a punk rock band from Edmonton, Canada
 Tijuana Smalls, a brand of flavored cigarette
 An informal colloquial term for undergarments